Statistics of Emperor's Cup in the 1929 season.

Overview
It was contested by 8 teams, and Kwangaku Club won the championship.

Results

Quarterfinals
Ho-sho Club – (retired) Hiroshima Bunri University
Kwangaku Club 6–1 Toyama Teachers College
Keio University 2–0 Imperial University of Kyoto
Hosei University 3–3 (lottery) Shizuoka High School

Semifinals
Ho-sho Club 0–5 Kwangaku Club
Keio University 2–2 (lottery) Hosei University

Final

Kwangaku Club 3–0 Hosei University
Kwangaku Club won the championship.

References
 NHK

Emperor's Cup
1929 in Japanese football